Marcus of Calabria was a fourth-century Roman bishop and delegate to the first Council of Nicaea.

Little is known of his life career or Episcopal work, and he would have remained largely unknown to history except that he was one of only five delegates from the Catholic Western Roman Empire to attend first Council of Nicaea.

He is listed as delegate 208 in the Greek version of the Patrum Nicaenorum Nomina as being Bishop of Calabria in Southern Italy; however, he is listed as a bishop from Dacia in the Syriac and the Greek text "Nicene Catalogue of Fathers and Cities", by Theodorus Lector, both of which record the proceedings of the First Council of Nicaea.

References

External links 
 Updated English Translations of the Creed, Rulings (Canons), and Letters Connected to the Council.
 
 
 The Road to Nicaea A descriptive overview of the events of the Council, by John Anthony McGuckin.
 The Council of Nicaea and the Bible This article deals with the legend that the canon of the bible was discussed at the council.

4th-century births
4th-century Romans
4th-century Italian bishops
Year of birth missing
Year of death missing